This is a list of earthquakes in 1924. Only magnitude 6.0 or greater earthquakes appear on the list. Lower magnitude events are included if they have caused death, injury or damage. Events which occurred in remote areas will be excluded from the list as they wouldn't have generated significant media interest. All dates are listed according to UTC time. Although it was still a fairly active year, the death toll in 1924 was substantially lower than in 1923. Dutch East Indies bore the brunt of the deadly quakes. Turkey, Algeria and China also had events which caused many deaths. Seismic activity remained high in Japan, and the Philippines and Russia saw many earthquakes as well.

Overall

By death toll 

 Note: At least 10 casualties

By magnitude 

 Note: At least 7.0 magnitude

Notable events

January

February

March

April

May

June

July

August

September

October

November

December

References

1924
 
1924